The Madonna dell'Orto is a church in Venice, Italy, in the sestiere of Cannaregio.

History
The church was erected by the now-defunct religious order the "Humiliati" in the mid-14th century, under the direction of Tiberio da Parma, who is buried in the interior. It was initially dedicated to St. Christopher, patron saint of travellers, but its popular name suggesting consecration to Holy Virgin comes from the following century, when an allegedly miraculous statue of the Madonna, commissioned for the Church of S. Maria Formosa but rejected, was brought to the Church from the nearby orchard (orto in Italian) where it had languished.

The church lay on weak foundations and in 1399 a restoration project was financed by the city's Maggior Consiglio. The Humiliati, due to their "depraved customs", were ousted in 1462 and the Madonna dell'Orto was assigned to the congregation of Canons Regular of San Giorgio in Alga. The latter order was suppressed in 1668, and the following year the Church and convent annexed were handed over to Cistercians of Lombardy. In 1787 the church came under public administration. Restoration was begun under Austrian rule in the 1840s and finished in 1869, by which time Venice had become part of the unified Kingdom of Italy.

Façade
The façade, built in 1460–1464, has sloping sides and is in brickwork, divided in three parts by two pilasters strips. The two side sections have quadruple mullioned windows, while the central has a large rose window. The portal is surmounted by a pointed arch with white stone decorations portraying, on the summit, St. Christopher, the Madonna and the Archangel Gabriel by Nicolò di Giovanni Fiorentino and Antonio Rizzo. Under is a tympanum, in porphyry, supported by circular pilaster strips. The whole is included into a porch with Corinthian columns.

The upper central section is decorated by small arches and bas-reliefs with geometrical motifs. The upper sides have instead twelve niches each, containing statues of the Apostles. Five other Gothic niches are in the central section, with 18th-century statues representing Prudence, Charity, Faith, Hope and Temperance, taken from the demolished church of Santo Stefano.

Interior
The interior has a nave and two aisles, with double-framed pointed arches supported by Greek marble columns. The transept is absent, while in the rear is a pentagonal apse decorated by paintings by Jacopo Robusti, known as Tintoretto, who is buried here. The organ over the entrance was built in 1878, and is one of the most powerful in Venice.

At an altar to the south/right of the main entrance is St. John Baptist and Saints by Cima da Conegliano, and in the fourth chapel on the North/left facing the main altar, the Contarini Chapel, there is a notable St. Agnes by Tintoretto. The Renaissance Valier Chapel once housed a small Madonna with Child by Giovanni Bellini (1481), stolen in 1993. Other works by Tintoretto in the church include a Presentation in the Temple (South aisle, close to the East end), Adoration of the Golden Calf, Last Judgement (both in the apse, either side of the main altar) and the Four Cardinal Virtues (in the upper storey of the apse, behind the altar), all from 1562 to 1564.

Right Nave

Sculpture of Madonna with Child, attributed to Antonio Rizzo
Altarpiece of St John Baptist with Saints Peter, Mark, Jerome, and Paul, by Cima da Conegliano.
St Christopher Martyr, copy of original by Cima da Conegliano
Altar of Immaculate conception: built in 1593 to accommodate miraculous statue now in Cappella San Mauro
Monument to Gerolamo Cavazza by Giuseppe Sardi (1624–1699)
Martrydom of St Lorenzo by Daniel van den Dyck.
Presentation of Virgin at Temple (1550–1553),  Tintoretto.

St  Mauro Chapel:
St Leonardo Murialdo (1983) Ernani Costantini
Miraculous Madonna, Giovanni De Santi, 14th century
Pieta, copy of work by Savoldo
Madonna with Child and St Mauro abbott, Antonio Molinari.

Sacristy
Canvas with Madonna with Child and Saints attributed to school of Paris Bourdon
Apse Chapel Right
Tomb of Tintoretto, bust by Napoleone Martinuzzi
Saints Augustine and Jerome, Girolamo Santacroce

Choir 
The Last Judgement (1563, right), Tintoretto
Idolatry of Golden Calf (1563, left),  Tintoretto
St. Peter’s Vision of the Cross (1550–1553) Left, Tintoretto.
Above: Cardinal virtues: Justice and Temperance, half-dome of apse: Decollation of St Paul (1550–1553), right side of apse,  Tintoretto
Above: Cardinal virtues: Prudence and Strength, Tintoretto
Annunciation (1590), Jacopo Palma il Giovane, from church of Santa Maria Nuova of Vicenza
Above: Faith, Pietro Ricchi

Left of main Nave
St Lorenzo Giustiniani and Saints, altarpiece copy of Il Pordenone original.
St George and the Dragon by Matteo Ponzone
Flagellation of Christ, Matteo Ponzone
God the Father in Glory (c. 1590) Domenico Tintoretto
Mystic marriage of Saint Catherine of Alexandria, School of Titian

Contarini Chapel:
Miracle of St  Agnes (1575),  Tintoretto
Funereal Monument of Contarini Family

Morosini Chapel:
The Nativity and Saint Dominic Domenico Tintoretto
Angels bearing incense, Domenico Tintoretto
Crucifixion, Jacopo Palma il Giovane from church of St Ternita

Vendramin Chapel:
Arcangel Raphael and Tobias (1530) Titian, now in sacristy of San Marziale
Painting of St Vincent with saints Domenic, Lorenzo Giustiniani, Elena and Pope Eugenius IV by Jacopo Palma the Elder. Figures of Saint Helena and St  Domenic inserted during restoration in 1867 by Placido Fabris

Valier Chapel:
Madonna with Child (1480) Giovanni Bellini (stolen 1993).

Bell tower
The bell tower, in brickwork, was finished in 1503. It has a square plan, with pilasters strips on the sides leading to the cell with circular mullioned windows. Four semicircular tympani divided the cell from the upper cylindrical tambour with an onion dome in Eastern style.

On the sides are four statues of Evangelists of Pietro Lombardo's school; on the summit is a statue of the Redeemer, in white marble. The old bells, the largest being from 1424, were replaced in 1883.

References

External links

 Interior of the church 
 Madonna dell'Orto parish website 
 Churches of Venice

Roman Catholic churches completed in 1464
Roman Catholic churches completed in 1503
Roman Catholic churches in Venice
14th-century Roman Catholic church buildings in Italy
15th-century Roman Catholic church buildings in Italy
Towers completed in the 16th century
Gothic architecture in Venice
Venetian Gothic architecture